Manu Ramesan is an Indian film composer who works predominantly in Malayalam cinema. He is the son of lyricist S. Ramesan Nair. He has composed songs for films such as Pidichirukku, Gulumal: The Escape (2009) and Plus Two (2010). The songs he composed for the movie Ayal Njanalla received rave reviews.

Personal life

Manu is the son of Malayalam lyricist S. Ramesan Nair and P. Rema. On 6 June 2010, he married Uma, an assistant professor in the Computer Science department of Amrita School of Arts and Sciences, Kochi. They have a daughter, Mayika, born on 19 August 2014. Uma died on 17 March 2021 due to stroke.

Filmography

References

External links
Official website archive

Manu Ramesan at MSI

People from Kanyakumari district
Living people
Indian male composers
Malayalam film score composers
Telugu film score composers
Tamil film score composers
20th-century Indian composers
Male film score composers
20th-century male musicians

Film musicians from Kerala
1982 births